The Makah are a Native American people of the U.S. state of Washington.

Makah may also refer to:

Makah language, the indigenous language of the Makah people
Makah Reservation, the Indian reservation of the Makah Indian Tribe
Makah Museum, a museum operated and founded by the Makah Indian Tribe
Makah Bay, a bay in Clallam County, Washington
Makah Peaks, mountain summits in the state of Washington
Makah Air Force Station, a closed United States Air Force General Surveillance Radar station near Neah Bay, Washington, United States

Other
Ashraf Makah

See also
Makaa (disambiguation)
Makkah (Mecca)
Ha-Makah Hashmonim V'Echad